The 2014 Independence Bowl was a college football bowl game played on December 27, 2014, at Independence Stadium in Shreveport, Louisiana, in the United States.  The 39th annual Independence Bowl, it pitted the Miami Hurricanes of the Atlantic Coast Conference against the South Carolina Gamecocks of the Southeastern Conference. The game started at 3:30 p.m. CST and aired ABC. It was one of the 2014–15 bowl games that concluded the 2014 FBS football season. Sponsored by duck call manufacturer Duck Commander, the game was officially known as the Duck Commander Independence Bowl.

Teams
The game featured the Miami Hurricanes of the Atlantic Coast Conference against the South Carolina Gamecocks of the Southeastern Conference.

This was the 16th overall meeting between these two teams, with Miami leading the series 8–5–2 going into the game. The last time these two teams met was in 1987.

Miami (Florida)

After finishing their regular season with a 6–6 record, the Hurricanes accepted their invitation to play in the game.

This was Miami's first Independence Bowl.

South Carolina

After finishing their regular season with a 6–6 record, the Gamecocks accepted their invitation to play in the game.

This was South Carolina's second Independence Bowl; the Gamecocks previously played in the 2005 game, with the 2005 South Carolina squad losing to the Missouri Tigers by a score of 38–31.

Game summary

Scoring summary

Source:

Statistics

References

Independence Bowl
Independence Bowl
Miami Hurricanes football bowl games
South Carolina Gamecocks football bowl games
Independence Bowl
Independence Bowl